The Armée Juive (Jewish Army), was a Zionist resistance movement in Nazi occupied Vichy France during World War II which was created during January 1942 in Toulouse. It was established and led by Abraham Polonski and his wife Eugénie, the socialist Lucien Lublin,  Russian poet David Knout, and his wife Ariadna Scriabina (daughter of the Russian composer Alexander Scriabin).

Armée Juive was originally called the Mouvement des Jeunesses Sionistes (M.J.S.). Its intention was to protect threatened Jews and take their fighting skills back to Palestine to help create a Jewish State there. At its height, it had over 2,000 members and was primarily concerned with helping Jews escape to Spain via the Pyrenees although it also conducted attacks and sabotage operations.

The first members of the AJ were recruited from a Torah study group headed by Rabbi Paul Roitman (1920). They included Arnold Mandel, Elie Rothnemer, Claude Strauss (writer Claude Vigée) and Maurice Hausner. They received funds to finance their activities from Marc Jarblum, the socialist president of the refugee Zionist Organization of France which operated from Switzerland.

The Army became the Organisation Juive de Combat and was officially registered under the French Forces of the Interior (FFI).
Placing my right hand on the blue and white flag, 

I swear fidelity to the Jewish Army

And obedience to its leaders. 

May my people live again, 

May Eretz-Israel be reborn. 

Liberty or death. - the oath of the Armée Juive.

Notable members
Frida Wattenberg (1924–2020)
Georges Loinger
Marcel Marceau
Cécile Reims

Notes

References
 Abraham Polonski and the Jewish resistance in France during the Second World War by Yehuda Ben-David, Yaʻel Zaidman, Miśrad ha-bitaḥon, 2002.
 Sephardi Jews in occupied France: under the tyrant's heel, 1940-1944 by Gitta Amipas-Silber, Rubin Mass, 1995.
 L'armée juive clandestine en France: 1940-1945 by Raphaël Delpard, Page après page, 2002.
 Jews in France during World War II by Renée Poznanski and Nathan Bracher, Brandeis University Press, 2001.
 Les Juifs dans la résistance et la libération: histoire, témoignages, débats by Yves-Claude Aouate and Anne Grynberg, 1985.
 Blessed is the match: the story of Jewish resistance by Marie Syrkin, Jewish Pubn Society, 1976.
 Contribution à l'histoire de la résistance juive en France, 1940-1944 by David Knout, Editions du Centre, 1947.

French Resistance networks and movements
Zionist organizations
Jewish resistance during the Holocaust
Zionism in France
Military organizations established in 1942